Nancy Jane Ramey (born June 29, 1940), later known by her married name Nancy Lethcoe, is an American former competition swimmer, 1956 Olympic medalist, and former world record-holder in two events.  After the Olympics, Ramey earned her doctorate and became a college instructor, environmental activist and political candidate. She and her husband Jim Lethcoe founded Prince William Sound Books. She authored books about Prince William Sound: Valdez Gold Rush Trails of 18  98-99, History of Prince William Sound,Cruising Guide to Prince William Sound, and Habitats of Change.

Biography
Ramey was born in Seattle and grew up on Mercer Island, Washington.  At time of the 1956 Olympics, she was a student at Mercer Island High School.  

As a 16-year-old, Ramey represented the United States at the 1956 Summer Olympics in Melbourne, Australia, where she won a silver medal in the 100 meter butterfly event.  In 1958 she set two world records in the 100 m and one in the 200 m butterfly; the same year she won five American and one Canadian national title. In 1959 she won a silver medal in the 100 m butterfly at the Pan American Games.

Later Ramey graduated from the University of Washington and earned M.A. and Ph.D. degrees from the University of Wisconsin. In the 1970s she worked as an assistant professor of religious studies at Stanford University. After that she organized Alaskan wilderness safaris, together with her husband Jim Lethcoe.

See also
 List of Olympic medalists in swimming (women)
 List of University of Washington people
 World record progression 100 metres butterfly
 World record progression 200 metres butterfly

References

External links 

 

1940 births
Living people
American female butterfly swimmers
World record setters in swimming
Olympic silver medalists for the United States in swimming
People from Mercer Island, Washington
Swimmers from Seattle
Stanford University Department of Religious Studies faculty
Swimmers at the 1956 Summer Olympics
Swimmers at the 1959 Pan American Games
University of Washington alumni
University of Wisconsin–Madison alumni
Medalists at the 1956 Summer Olympics
Pan American Games silver medalists for the United States
Pan American Games medalists in swimming
Medalists at the 1959 Pan American Games
20th-century American women